Ferries in Hobart do not provide a major alternative public transport service for commuters and tourists in Hobart and other localities in and around the Derwent River in Tasmania. Services at the present time focus only on tourism services. However, a year long trial of a ferry service between Bellerive and Brooke Street Pier will commence in August 2021.

History

Since the earliest times of settlement in Hobart, river transport has been used to allow people to move around the city. Prior to the construction of the Hobart Bridge, and its replacement the Tasman Bridge, ferry services were far more important, and previously called at more locations. Following the reconstruction of a public jetty at Opossum Bay in December 2006, calls were made for a more organised and regular commuter ferry service.

Current services
Commencing 9 August 2021, the first year of the Derwent River ferry trial provided 15 crossings of the River Derwent each weekday (excluding public holidays) operated by Derwent Ferries between the City and Bellerive. The service had capacity for 535 city bound and 321 Bellerive bound passengers per day. Travel was free for Greencard holders and those travelling with a bicycle or e-scooter until the 8 August 2022 when fares were introduced for these passengers for the second year of the trial.  Starting on the 29 October 2022 services were extended to Saturday and 130,000 passengers were reported to have taken the ferry by this date. In 2022 three new locations were planned in Sandy Bay, Lindisfarne and Wilkinsons Point after the Australian Federal government provided $20 million for the new terminals. 

There are a number of operators that run ferries upon the Derwent River out of Hobart which include Hobart Historic Cruises (Spirit of Hobart), MONA (Mona Roma 1 or MR1 and Freya or MR2), Navigators (Peppermint Bay II and Peppermint Bay 1 or MR0) and Pennicott Wilderness Journeys.

The majority of these services are for tourism related purposes.

Short services include Derwent Harbour cruise, Moorilla Estate, Iron Pot, Bruny Island and Storm Bay
 
Longer ferry services take passengers to visit the D'Entrecasteaux Channel and stop at Woodbridge and Kettering.

Jet Boat services operate out of Hobart, New Norfolk and Huonville.

Other ferry services in Southern Tasmania
Ferry Services operate out of 
Triabunna to Maria Island,
 
Kettering to Bruny Island (Mirambeena, Bowen, Moongalba),

Adventure Bay,

Port Arthur for the Three Capes Walk (The Blade),

Port Arthur harbour cruise including small islands (MV Marana),

and Port Arthur to Eaglehawk Neck

Future services
In May 2018, it was announced that the State Government would introduce legislation to allow Metro Tasmania to introduce a service from Bellerive to Sullivans Cove.

Tasman Bridge disaster
Following the Tasman Bridge disaster in 1975, services across the Derwent River were operated by Sullivans Cove Ferry Services (Owner Bob Clifford - Vessels Mathew Brady and James McCabe) and the Roche Brothers Pty. Ltd (Cartela) while the Public Transport Commission loaned the State Government the Sydney ferries Kosciusko and Lady Wakehurst (Kosciusko was soon sold to Hobart).

Later ferries Included:

Sullivans Cove Ferry Services - Martin Cash

Wakatere (hovercraft)

References

Ferries of Tasmania edition 2
Tim Kingston

Further reading
 O’May, D. G. (1988) Ferries of the Derwent : a history of the ferry services on the Derwent River Hobart: Govt. Printer. 
 Sargent, John R. (2004) Derwent River connections : an historical snapshot of vehicular access across the River DerwentBellerive, Tas. John R. Sargent. 

Transport in Hobart
Ferry transport in Tasmania
Maritime history of Australia